Boock is a surname. Notable people with the surname include:

Paula Boock (born 1964), New Zealand writer and editor
Peter-Jürgen Boock (born 1951), German member of the Red Army Faction
Stephen Boock (born 1951), New Zealand cricketer

See also
Brock (surname)